Amaia Aberasturi Franco (born 28 April 1997) is a Spanish actress, best known for her roles in 2020 drama film Coven and television series 45 rpm.

Filmography

Film

Television

References

External links

 

1997 births
Living people
Spanish film actresses
21st-century Spanish actresses
Spanish television actresses
Actresses from the Basque Country (autonomous community)
People from Arratia-Nerbioi